Child: Care, Health and Development is a bimonthly peer-reviewed public health journal published by Wiley-Blackwell on behalf of the British Association of Community Child Health, the Swiss Paediatric Society, and the European Society for Social Pediatrics. The journal was established in 1975 and covers child health issues such as childhood illness, health care, paediatrics, and social work. 

According to the Journal Citation Reports, the journal has a 2011 impact factor of 1.201, ranking it 45th out of 68 journals in the category "Psychology Developmental" and 70th out of 115 in the category "Pediatrics".

References

External links

Wiley-Blackwell academic journals
English-language journals
Publications established in 1975
Quarterly journals
Pediatrics journals
Developmental psychology journals